Mesepiola specca is a moth of the family Prodoxidae. It is found in desert and chaparral habitats in southern California, Arizona and New Mexico.

The wingspan is 8–12 mm. Adults have relatively narrow forewings with a mosaic of white, fuscous and rusty scales. The hindwings are uniform brown. Females have a hooked appendage on the seventh tergite, used to anchor the abdomen against a floral calyx when cutting into the ovary of the host plant. Adults feed on flower nectar of the larval host plants.

The larvae feed on Nolina and Dasylirion species. The larvae complete their development inside one or more seeds. When fully grown, they burrow into the soil, where pupation takes place.

References

Prodoxidae
Monotypic moth genera
Adeloidea genera
Moths of North America